Karly (Qarlı) is a rural locality (a village) in Mrakovsky Selsoviet, Gafuriysky District, Bashkortostan, Russia. The population was 78 as of 2010. There are 2 streets.

Geography 
Karly is located 36 km southwest of Krasnousolsky (the district's administrative centre) by road. Mrakovo is the nearest rural locality.

References 

Rural localities in Gafuriysky District